Frontier Scout may refer to:
 Quincannon, Frontier Scout, a 1956 American Western film
 Frontier Scout (1938 film), an American Western film